Manola may refer to:
Another name for Maja, a stereotypical traditional Spanish woman
Manola (fly), a genus of tachinid flies
Manola, Alberta, a hamlet in Alberta, Canada
The name of an English translation of the comic opera Le jour et la nuit.